Norbert Radefeld (born 3 March 1962), (died October 2009) was a West German hammer thrower. His personal best throw was 78.28 metres, achieved in July 1988 in Frankfurt am Main.

He competed at the 1990 European Championships without reaching the final. Radefeld represented the sports club VfL Wolfsburg, and won the silver medal at the West German championships in 1988.

Achievements

References

1962 births
Living people
German male hammer throwers